El Remolino is a community that is located in the municipality of Juchipila in the state of Zacatecas in Mexico. The population of "El Remolino" is 737 people and is 1220 meters above sea level.

El Remolino as such was founded in the late eighteenth century, but there are indications that people inhabited the moment that this was founded.

FENARE
Employer's fair holy cross or Feria Nacional de El Remolino FENARE (National Fair of The Remolino NAFARE) takes place from mid-nineteenth century, in honor of the Holy Cross will be held on 3 May, this holiday began with processions and dances the third day of May, but over the years, things were being added like the peoples theater, amusement rides, among others, which has become one of the most important events in the municipality of Juchipila. These are organized by a committee that is elected by the previous committee, this raises funds for the traditional lottery on Sundays after Mass, with the sale of gorditas on Saturdays and Sundays, and some dinners, etc..

This festival had brought every year without fail until 2009, when he declared influenza pandemic AH1N1 when Zacatecas state authorities prohibit the making of any party bosses. What provoked the discontent of the people, for various reasons such as the arrival of American tourists to this event and especially not performed these tradition, this event was re-organized for late October 2009.

Main features El Remolino
One of the major tourist attractions in El Remolinois the hill of the windows, there was a refuge for groups after the war Caxcanes Mixton, they left many traces, including a cave is a wall with windows, which give its name to the hill.

The main tributaries are El Remolino: The river Juchipila Brook neighborhood above the creek Sanjon, among others.

In El Remolino now part of the population of El Remolino live in the U.S., especially in Los Angeles, California.

With regard to education in the eddy are kindergarten, primary and extramural. The installation of the Polytechnic University of the South of Zacatecas, which benefits the people of El Remolino and so avoid partly emigration to the United States.

With regard to trade, there are several grocery stores, a convenience store, cyber Remolomania, among others.

External links
Their web site is http://elremolino.com.mx and your blog is http://cerrodelasventanas.blogspot.com

Populated places in Zacatecas